The Ampang River is a river in Selangor, Malaysia.

See also
 List of rivers of Malaysia

Rivers of Selangor
Nature sites of Selangor